Manuel Fischnaller (born 20 July 1991) is an Italian professional footballer who plays as a striker for  club Fermana.

Club career
Fischnaller began his career with F.C. Neugries in 2000, spending four years with the club's youth side, of which his father Alfred was head coach. In 2004 Fischnaller joined Südtirol, graduating from the youth system to join the senior squad in 2008. In a season and a half with the senior side he scored 6 goals in 32 appearances, bringing him to the attention of Juventus F.C. scouts. On 23 December 2009, it was announced that Serie A's Juventus had signed Fischnaller on loan, with the option to make the transfer permanent at the end of the season. It was also noted that he would remain in the youth ranks of the club, for the time being. The signing was Juventus' first signing of the 2009–10 winter transfer market. Fischnaller returned to Südtirol on 1 July 2010, and in August he signed a new 3-year contract with club. In July 2012, Fischnaller joined Serie B club Reggina on a four-year deal. In the summer of 2015, he was transferred to Alessandria signing a four-year contract. In the summer of 2018 he signed a biannual contract with Catanzaro. On 25 January 2020 he returned to Südtirol once more, signing a 3.5-year contract.

On 1 September 2022, Fischnaller moved to Fermana on a two-year deal.

International career
Fischnaller was a member of the Italy national under-20 football team, making his debut in a Four-Nations-Championship in November 2008 in Germany.

References

1991 births
Living people
Sportspeople from Bolzano
Germanophone Italian people
Italian footballers
Association football forwards
Serie A players
Serie B players
Serie C players
F.C. Südtirol players
Juventus F.C. players
Reggina 1914 players
U.S. Alessandria Calcio 1912 players
U.S. Catanzaro 1929 players
Fermana F.C. players
Italy youth international footballers
Footballers from Trentino-Alto Adige/Südtirol